Järvdalen Nature Reserve is a nature reserve in Jämtland County in Sweden. It is part of the EU-wide Natura 2000-network.

The nature reserve protects an area of old-growth forest, wetlands, lakes and areas of exposed bedrock. Within the nature reserve there are several different kinds of ancient forest, dominated by Scots pine, spruce and birch, respectively. To the west, the nature reserve borders on Vålådalen Nature Reserve.

References

Nature reserves in Sweden
Natura 2000 in Sweden
Tourist attractions in Jämtland County
Geography of Jämtland County
Protected areas established in 2005
2005 establishments in Sweden